Dániel Hauser (born 22 August 1986) is a Hungarian football player who currently plays for MTK Hungária FC.

In the 2002/03 season, he was a member of the Hungary under -17 squad that reach the 2003 UEFA European Under-17 Football Championship.

Honours
Hungary 
UEFA European Under-17 Football Championship: 
Final Tournament 2003

References 
HLSZ
UEFA U-17 Football Championship

1986 births
Living people
Footballers from Budapest
Hungarian footballers
Association football midfielders
MTK Budapest FC players
Soroksári TE footballers